Soziale Frauenschule was the name given to certain educational institutions that emerged in Germany between the turn of the century and the beginning of the 1920s.

In the course of the women's movement, they pursued the goal of vocational training for women in the welfare care sector. Another aim was to overcome the hardship of the First World War, which particularly affected women, who were to be supported by qualified female staff. The first Sociale Frauenschule (Social Women's School) was established as a further development of a training school for kindergarten teachers in Berlin in 1908, founded by Alice Salomon, who also directed the school. It offered a broad two-year training with theoretical and practical parts side by side. The teachers came from the environment of the health department and welfare office and initially taught voluntarily. By the First World War, there were 14 women's social schools in Germany.

Examples of such facilities:

References 

History of education in Germany